The 2021 Miami Open was a professional hardcourt tennis tournament played from March 23 to April 4, 2021, on the grounds of Hard Rock Stadium in Miami Gardens, Florida. The 36th edition of the Miami Open, it was a Masters 1000 event on the 2021 ATP Tour, and a WTA 1000 event on the 2021 WTA Tour. The 2020 edition was postponed due to the onset of the COVID-19 pandemic in Florida.

Due to COVID-19 restrictions, capacity for each session was limited to 800–1,000 spectators, and spectators were only admitted in the three largest courts on the site (excluding Hard Rock Stadium proper, which was not used). Roger Federer and Ashleigh Barty were the defending champions from 2019 in the men's and women's singles respectively. Barty successfully defended her title, defeating Bianca Andreescu in the final, 6–3, 4–0, retired. Federer did not attend the tournament.

Champions

Men's singles

  Hubert Hurkacz def.  Jannik Sinner 7–6(7–4), 6–4.

Women's singles

  Ashleigh Barty def.  Bianca Andreescu 6–3, 4–0 ret.

Men's doubles

  Nikola Mektić /  Mate Pavić def.  Dan Evans /  Neal Skupski 6–4, 6–4.

Women's doubles

  Shuko Aoyama /  Ena Shibahara def.  Hayley Carter /  Luisa Stefani, 6–2, 7–5.

Points and prize money

Point distribution

* Players with byes receive first round points.

Prize money

ATP singles main-draw entrants 

The following are the seeded players. Seedings and ranking points based on ATP rankings as of March 22, 2021.

		
† The player did not qualify for the tournament in 2019. Accordingly, this was his points from the ATP Challenger Tour.
‡ The player did not qualify for the tournament in 2019. Accordingly, this was his 18th best result deducted instead.
н The player used an exemption after the completion of the tournament in 2019. Accordingly, this was his points from the ATP Challenger Tour.

Other entrants
The following players received wildcards into the singles main draw:
  Carlos Alcaraz
  Jack Draper
  Hugo Gaston
  Michael Mmoh
  Andy Murray

The following players received entry using a protected ranking into the singles main draw:
  Kevin Anderson
  Lu Yen-hsun

The following players received entry from the qualifying draw:
  Liam Broady
  Ernesto Escobedo
  Thomas Fabbiano
  Bjorn Fratangelo
  Thanasi Kokkinakis
  Paolo Lorenzi 
  Mackenzie McDonald
  Shintaro Mochizuki
  Emilio Nava
  Thiago Seyboth Wild
  Alejandro Tabilo
  Mischa Zverev

The following players received entry as a lucky losers:
  Damir Džumhur
  Federico Gaio

Withdrawals
Before the tournament
  Pablo Andújar → replaced by  Federico Coria
  Pablo Carreño Busta → replaced by  João Sousa
  Matteo Berrettini → replaced by  Denis Kudla
  Borna Ćorić → replaced by  Yannick Hanfmann
  Pablo Cuevas → replaced by  Pedro Martínez
  Alejandro Davidovich Fokina → replaced by  Mikael Ymer
  Novak Djokovic → replaced by  Alexei Popyrin
  Kyle Edmund → replaced by  James Duckworth
  Roger Federer → replaced by  Marcos Giron
  Richard Gasquet → replaced by  Yasutaka Uchiyama
  Filip Krajinović → replaced by  Ilya Ivashka
  Nick Kyrgios → replaced by  Emil Ruusuvuori
  John Millman → replaced by  Lorenzo Musetti
  Gaël Monfils → replaced by  Pierre-Hugues Herbert
  Thiago Monteiro → replaced by  Damir Džumhur
  Corentin Moutet → replaced by  Mikhail Kukushkin
  Andy Murray → replaced by  Federico Gaio
  Rafael Nadal → replaced by  Pedro Sousa
  Guido Pella → replaced by  Lloyd Harris
  Albert Ramos Viñolas → replaced by  Daniel Elahi Galán
  Casper Ruud → replaced by  Christopher O'Connell
  Gilles Simon → replaced by  Kwon Soon-woo
  Dominic Thiem → replaced by  Federico Delbonis
  Jo-Wilfried Tsonga → replaced by  Sebastian Korda
  Stan Wawrinka → replaced by  Steve Johnson
During the tournament
  Lloyd Harris

Retirements
  Jack Draper
  Pedro Martínez

ATP doubles main-draw entrants

Seeds

1 Rankings as of March 15, 2021.

Other entrants
The following pairs received wildcards into the doubles main draw:
  Steve Johnson /  Sam Querrey
  Sebastian Korda /  Michael Mmoh
  Nicholas Monroe /  Frances Tiafoe
The following pair received entry as an alternate:
  Marcelo Demoliner /  Santiago González

Withdrawals
Before the tournament
  Alex de Minaur /  John Millman → replaced by  Miomir Kecmanović /  Aisam-ul-Haq Qureshi
  Grigor Dimitrov /  Kei Nishikori → replaced by  Marcelo Demoliner /  Santiago González

During the tournament
  Karen Khachanov /  Andrey Rublev

WTA singles main-draw entrants

Seeds
The following are the seeded players. Seedings are based on WTA rankings as of March 15, 2021. Rankings and points before are as of March 22, 2021.

^ Points form 2019 Miami, 2019 Guadalajara, 2019 Charleston and 2019 Monterrey will be dropped on Monday, April 5; 2019 Indian Wells will not be mandatory anymore

¡ Miami will not be considered a mandatory result that must be counted as part of a player's best 16 results

† The player did not qualify for the tournament in 2019. Accordingly, this was her 16th best result deducted instead.

Other entrants

The following players received wildcards into the singles main draw:
  Anna Kalinskaya
  Ana Konjuh
  Robin Montgomery
  Storm Sanders
  Katrina Scott
  Mayar Sherif
  Wang Xinyu
  Wang Xiyu

The following player received entry using a protected ranking into the singles main draw:
  Katie Boulter
  Andrea Petkovic
  Anastasia Potapova
  Yaroslava Shvedova

The following players received entry from the qualifying draw:
  Hailey Baptiste
  Aliona Bolsova
  Mihaela Buzărnescu
  Elisabetta Cocciaretto
  Olga Danilović
  Océane Dodin
  Kristína Kučová
  Tereza Martincová
  Tsvetana Pironkova
  Liudmila Samsonova
  Nina Stojanović
  Renata Zarazúa

The following player received entry as a lucky loser:
  Kirsten Flipkens

Withdrawals
Before the tournament
  Polona Hercog → replaced by  Andrea Petkovic
  Hsieh Su-wei → replaced by  Anastasia Potapova 
  Daria Kasatkina → replaced by  Zarina Diyas
  Ann Li → replaced by  Katie Boulter
  Karolína Muchová → replaced by  Camila Giorgi
  Anastasia Pavlyuchenkova → replaced by  Lauren Davis
  Alison Riske → replaced by  Kirsten Flipkens
  Barbora Strýcová → replaced by  Marta Kostyuk
  Patricia Maria Țig → replaced by  Madison Brengle
  Alison Van Uytvanck → replaced by  Nao Hibino
  Donna Vekić → replaced by  Arantxa Rus
  Serena Williams → replaced by  Christina McHale
  Dayana Yastremska (provisional suspension) → replaced by  Venus Williams

During the tournament
  Simona Halep
  Laura Siegemund
  Nina Stojanović

Retirements
  Bianca Andreescu
  Jil Teichmann

WTA doubles main-draw entrants

Seeds 

1 Rankings as of March 15, 2021.

Other entrants
The following pairs received wildcards into the doubles main draw:
  Hailey Baptiste /  Robin Montgomery
  Kiki Bertens /  Arantxa Rus 
  Ajla Tomljanović /  Heather Watson

The following pairs received entry using a protected ranking into the doubles main draw:
  Kaitlyn Christian /  Alla Kudryavtseva
  Kirsten Flipkens /  CoCo Vandeweghe
  Vania King /  Yaroslava Shvedova

The following pairs received entry as an alternate:
  Ekaterina Alexandrova /  Zhaoxuan Yang
  Caroline Garcia /  Nadia Podoroska
  Petra Martić /  Shelby Rogers
  Asia Muhammad /  Jessica Pegula

Withdrawals
Before the tournament
  Ashleigh Barty /  Jennifer Brady → replaced by  Caroline Garcia /  Nadia Podoroska
  Belinda Bencic /  Jil Teichmann → replaced by  Petra Martić /  Shelby Rogers
  Anna Kalinskaya /  Viktória Kužmová → replaced by  Ekaterina Alexandrova /  Zhaoxuan Yang
  Laura Siegemund /  Vera Zvonareva → replaced by  Asia Muhammad /  Jessica Pegula
During the tournament
  Simona Halep /  Angelique Kerber
  Darija Jurak /  Nina Stojanović

References

External links